Mazaeras melanopyga is a moth of the family Erebidae. It was described by Francis Walker in 1869. It is found in Brazil.

References

 

Phaegopterina
Moths described in 1869